This is a list of flag bearers who have represented Malawi at the Olympics.

Flag bearers carry the national flag of their country at the opening ceremony of the Olympic Games.

See also
Malawi at the Olympics

References

Malawi at the Olympics
Malawi
Olympic flagbearers
Olympic flagbearers